Lucas Cantoro (born 3 April 1979, in Argentina) is an Argentine retired footballer who is last known to have played for Isernia in Italy in 2016.

Career 
Cantoro started his senior career with Club Atlético Vélez Sarsfield. In 2011, he signed for Hà Nội in the Vietnamese V.League 1, where he made twenty-four league appearances and scored sixteen goals. After that, he played for Maltese club Qormi and Italian clubs Pol. Olympia Agnonese and Isernia before retiring in 2016.

References

External links 
 Lucas Cantoro (HN.ACB): Tỏa sáng ở tuổi 32 
 Chuyển động tại HN.T&T: Lucas Cantoro mất suất
 Bóng đá Việt Nam, đất lành cho “sao già” 
 Esclusivo, Lucas Cantoro: “Foggia è nel cuore, spero nella B. Quella doppietta al San Paolo…” 
 ESCLUSIVA - Cantoro: “Sarebbe un sogno chiudere la Foggia 
 La promessa di Cantoro: darò tutto 
 Pisa, gli argentini non tradiscono mai 
 Calcio Foggia Tag 
 CosenzaChannel.it Tag 
 wiz.MLsFa0gAHyU&ved=0ahUKEwiDnK2IwMTlAhWRup4KHTQzDi8Q4dUDCAs&uact=5 isNews Tag 
 Vietnamese Wikipedia Page 
 En Una Baldosa Profile  
 
 Malta Football Association Profile

Argentine people of Italian descent
Argentine footballers
V.League 1 players
Argentine expatriate footballers
Qormi F.C. players
Club Atlético Vélez Sarsfield footballers
Racing Club de Montevideo players
A.C. Monza players
Isernia F.C. players
Expatriate footballers in Italy
Expatriate footballers in Vietnam
Expatriate footballers in Uruguay
Expatriate footballers in Malta
1979 births
Living people
Association football forwards